Pauline and Paulette (original title: Pauline & Paulette) is a 2001 Belgian comedy-drama film directed and co-written by Lieven Debrauwer.
The movie was the Belgian entry for the Academy Awards 2001 in the category Best Foreign Language Film but failed to receive the actual nomination.

Cast 
 Dora van der Groen as Pauline
 Ann Petersen as Paulette
 Rosemarie Bergmans as Cécile
 Julienne De Bruyn as Martha
 Idwig Stéphane as Albert
 Bouli Lanners as Taxi driver

Plot 
Pauline (van der Groen) is a 'little girl of 66 years old'. She is mentally retarded and being cared after by her sister, Martha. When Martha dies, her two younger sisters, Paulette (Petersen) and Cecile have to make a decision on the best place for Pauline to be looked after. Neither of them is ready to take care of her. Paulette has a shop to look after and Cecile has her Albert. But, according to Martha's will, her fortune will only be divided in three equal parts if one of the sisters looks after Pauline. If they decide to take her to an institution, Pauline will be the only heir.

Awards and nominations 
 Joseph Plateau Awards:
 Best Belgian Actress (Dora van der Groen, won)
 Best Belgian Actress (Ann Petersen, nominated)
 Best Belgian Director (Lieven Debrauwer, won)
 Best Belgian Film (won)
 Best Belgian Screenplay (Jaak Boon and Lieven Debrauwer, won)
 World Soundtrack Awards:
 WSA for Best Original Score of the Year Not Released on an Album (Frédéric Devreese, nominated)

See also 
 List of Belgian submissions for Academy Award for Best Foreign Language Film

2001 films
Belgian comedy-drama films
2000s Dutch-language films
Films about sisters
Films scored by Frédéric Devreese
Dutch-language Belgian films
Films about disability